Manchester Township, Ohio may refer to:

Manchester Township, Adams County, Ohio
Manchester Township, Morgan County, Ohio

Ohio township disambiguation pages